The Embassy of Malta in Washington, D.C., is the Republic of Malta's diplomatic mission to the United States. It is located at  2017 Connecticut Avenue, N.W. in Washington, D.C.'s Kalorama neighborhood. The embassy also serves as the High Commission of Malta to Canada and the Bahamas.

The current ambassador is Pierre Clive Agius.

Chancery
Built in 1903 to the designs of noted architect Waddy B. Wood, 2017 and 2019 Connecticut Avenue (historically known as the Wood-Deming Houses) are examples of Colonial Revival architecture. 

The chancery is designated as a contributing property to the Kalorama Triangle Historic District, listed on the National Register of Historic Places in 1987.

See also
Embassy of the United States, Attard

References

External links

Official website

Malta
Washington, D.C.
Malta–United States relations
Canada–Malta relations